Sarah Marjorie Savage Pearsall is an American historian specialized in the history of North America between  1500 and c. 1800. She is a professor and director of undergraduate studies at the Johns Hopkins University Zanvyl Krieger School of Arts and Sciences. 

Pearsall completed a Ph.D. at Harvard University. Her 2001 dissertation was titled After All These Revolutions: Epistolary Identities in an Atlantic World, 1760-1815. Her doctoral advisor was Laurel Thatcher Ulrich.

Pearsall is a fellow of the Royal Historical Society. She was co-editor of The Historical Journal.

Selected works

References

External links 

Living people
Year of birth missing (living people)
Place of birth missing (living people)
21st-century American historians
Historians of the United States
Historians of the American Revolution
American women historians
Harvard University alumni
Johns Hopkins University faculty
21st-century American women writers
Fellows of the Royal Historical Society